Qëndrim Guri (born 27 November 1993 in Ferizaj) is a Kosovan cyclist. He competed in the road race at the 2016 Summer Olympics as well as the road race at the 2015 European Games.

Major results
2011
 3rd Overall Tour of Kosovo
2014
 1st  Road race, National Road Championships
2015
 1st  Road race, National Road Championships
2016
 National Road Championships
2nd Time trial
3rd Road race

References

External links
 

1993 births
Living people
Kosovan male cyclists
Cyclists at the 2016 Summer Olympics
Olympic cyclists of Kosovo
European Games competitors for Kosovo
Cyclists at the 2015 European Games